Manlio Molinari (born 24 August 1964) is a retired Sammarinese athlete who competed in the 400 and 800 metres. He represented his country at four consecutive Summer Olympics, starting in 1984.

He still holds national records in several events.

International competitions

Personal bests
Outdoor
800 metres – 1:51.8 (San Marino 1997) NR
1000 metres – 2:30.9 (Riccione 1989) NR
110 metres hurdles – 16.52 (Modena 2000) NR
400 metres hurdles – 56.04 (Benevento 1991) ex-NR

Indoor
400 metres – 49.14 (Liévin 1987) NR
800 metres – 1:54.6 (Ancona 1987) NR
60 metres hurdles – 9.22 (Ancona 2000) NR

References

1964 births
Living people
Sammarinese male sprinters
Sammarinese male middle-distance runners
World Athletics Championships athletes for San Marino
Athletes (track and field) at the 1984 Summer Olympics
Athletes (track and field) at the 1988 Summer Olympics
Athletes (track and field) at the 1992 Summer Olympics
Athletes (track and field) at the 1996 Summer Olympics
Olympic athletes of San Marino
Athletes (track and field) at the 1991 Mediterranean Games
Mediterranean Games competitors for San Marino